Chris Martinez may refer to:

 Chris Martinez (soccer) (born 1970), American soccer defender
 Chris Martinez (director), Filipino film scriptwriter, director, producer and playwright